Beijing Chaoyang railway station, formerly known as Xinghuo railway station, is a railway station in Chaoyang District, Beijing. This station is the main terminus of the Beijing–Harbin high-speed railway, and one of eight main passenger-service stations of the Beijing railway hub.

History
Station construction began in 1966 with the proposed name of Xinzhuang railway station, named after the nearby village. However, there had been a station with the same name in Tianjin. When the station opened in 1968, it was named Xinghuo railway station, after the Xinghuo People's commune (now Liulitun Subdistrict), and the Xinghuo People's commune is named after a famous article written by Mao Zedong, A Single Spark Can Start a Prairie Fire.

Xinghuo railway station had been a passenger-service station for through trains on the Beijing–Baotou railway (Shuangqiao-Shahe railway), but all passenger services were canceled in 1996 with the speed-up projects. It has been an industrial freight station linking factories including a granary, a cotton depot, a thermal power plant, and the China National Railway Track Test Center (famous for the loop track).

In 2013, Xinghuo railway station was confirmed as the largest terminus of the planned Beijing–Shenyang high-speed railway and renovations began in 2017. During the 2020 Two Sessions, CPPCC member Pi Jianlong advised that the station name should be changed to Beijing Chaoyang railway station for the Chaoyang District in Beijing. Investigated and surveyed by the related ministries and commanded by the Premier, the station formally changed its name to Beijing Chaoyang railway station in June 2020, and the former Chaoyang railway station in Liaoning Province changed its name to Liaoning Chaoyang railway station.

Renovation
The Beijing Chaoyang railway station has seven platforms and 15 lines (excluding two freight lines outside the station building) for a building area of  after renovation. The station is collaborated designed by AREP and China Railway Design Corporation since 2016.  The construction began in 2018 by China Railway 6th Bureau Group and China Railway Construction Engineering Group, and capped on 30 May 2020 and finished decoration in the end of 2020.

The new station began operation on 22 January 2021.

Design and Structure 
Beijing Chaoyang station building can be divided into the central part and the west part, in which the central part covers 110,000 square meters, and the west part covers 70,000 square meters. The architectural design theme shows the vitality of the city, satisfying the general requirements of becoming an integrated, green, warm, economic, and convenient transportation hub. The outside facade is a three-segment shape that blends traditional  culture and modernity. The glass curtain wall on the north side of the building not only broadens the view and for day lighting, but also hints at the direction of Shenyang, the other end of the line. The upper roof image is derived from the roofs of the ancient Forbidden City.

Beijing Subway

The under-construction Line 3 of Beijing Subway will serve the railway station in late 2023. in long-term planning, Line 20 will also serve this station.

References

Railway stations in Chaoyang District, Beijing